Multilaw is an international professional services network of independent law firms. It was established in 1990 and comprises over 90 member firms in more than 100 countries.  Multilaw has been ranked as an Elite network for the 8th year running by Chambers Global Guide 2022. In March 2017, at the Lawyer European Awards, Multilaw was named "2017 Global Network of the Year".

Member firms
Multilaw member firms are individually selected for admission and all member firms are subject to an appraisal every three years. Multilaw has received recognition from Chambers and Partners for its "Business and corporate relationships frequently embracing ever-changing combinations of nations, continents, cultures, languages and laws."

Governance
Multilaw is governed by a management committee and a board of directors consisting of representatives from three regions: EMEA, Asia Pacific and Americas with Adam Cooke as the Executive Director. Multilaw operates from its global headquarters in London, UK.
 
Carmo Sousa Machado of Abreu Advogados Lisbon, Portugal is the current Multilaw chairperson.

References

External links
 

Companies based in the City of London
Business services companies established in 1990
Professional networks
International law organizations
1990 establishments in England